Yosvany Sánchez (born 17 September 1975) is a Cuban wrestler. He competed at the 1996 Summer Olympics and the 2000 Summer Olympics.

References

1975 births
Living people
Cuban male sport wrestlers
Olympic wrestlers of Cuba
Wrestlers at the 1996 Summer Olympics
Wrestlers at the 2000 Summer Olympics
Sportspeople from Matanzas
Pan American Games medalists in wrestling
Pan American Games silver medalists for Cuba
Wrestlers at the 1999 Pan American Games
20th-century Cuban people
21st-century Cuban people